The Union of Kėdainiai (or Agreement of Kėdainiai, Lithuanian: Kėdainių unija, Swedish: Kėdainiai förbund) was an agreement between several magnates of the Grand Duchy of Lithuania and the king of the Swedish Empire, Charles X Gustav, that was signed on 20 October 1655, during the Swedish Deluge of the Second Northern War. In contrast to the Treaty of Kėdainiai of 17 August, which put Lithuania under Swedish protection, the Swedish–Lithuanian union's purpose was to end the Lithuanian union with Poland and to set up two separate principalities in the Grand Duchy of Lithuania.

One of them was to be ruled by the Radziwiłł (Radvila) family, and the rest of the duchy was to remain a Swedish protectorate. 

The agreement was short-lived since the Swedish defeat at the Battles of Warka and Prostki and an uprising organised by the pro-Commonwealth nobility in Poland and Lithuania put an end to Swedish power and to the Radziwiłłs' influence.

History
The Radziwiłł family owned vast areas of land in Lithuania and Poland, and some of its members were dissatisfied with the role of the magnates, who in Poland–Lithuania theoretically had the same rights as the Polish nobility. Eventually, the interests of the wealthy clan, known as the "Family", and the Crown began to drift apart.

In 1654, during the Swedish-Russian invasion of Poland, known as The Deluge, two notable princes of the Radziwiłł clan, Janusz and Bogusław, began negotiations with Swedish King Charles X Gustav that were aimed at dissolving the Polish–Lithuanian Commonwealth and the Union. Lithuania was then in turmoil and was being attacked on two separate fronts by Russia and Sweden, and a Ukrainian peasant revolt, known as the Khmelnytsky Uprising, was spilling into the Grand Duchy's southern regions from Ukraine. Eventually, most of the Polish-controlled Lithuanian army surrendered to the Swedes, and the state collapsed. Most of the Crown of Poland, along with west of Lithuania, was occupied by Swedish forces, and the Russians seized most of Lithuania (except Samogitia and parts of Suvalkija and Aukštaitija).

On 17 August, Janusz Radziwiłł signed the Treaty of Kėdainiai, which places the Grand Duchy under Swedish protection. On 10 October 1655 (O.S.), Janusz and Bogusław Radziwiłł signed an agreement with the Swedes at their castle at Kėdainiai. According to the treaty, signed by over 1,000 members of the Lithuanian nobility, the Polish–Lithuanian Union was declared null and void. In exchange for military assistance against Russia, the Grand Duchy of Lithuania would become a protectorate of Sweden, with a personal union joining both states. In addition, The Family would be given two sovereign principalities carved from its lands within the Grand Duchy, and the Lithuanian nobility would retain its liberties and privileges.

Its main proponent, Janusz Radziwiłł, died only two months after it was signed, on 31 December at Tykocin Castle, which was then besieged by forces loyal to the King of Poland and the Grand Duke of Lithuania, John II Casimir. The castle was soon taken by Paweł Jan Sapieha, who immediately succeeded Janusz Radziwiłł to the office of Grand Hetman of Lithuania.

The tide of the war soon turned and a popular uprising in Poland broke the power of the Swedish army. The Swedish occupation of Lithuania sparked a similar uprising in Lithuania. The Swedish defeat and the eventual retreat from the territories of the Commonwealth abruptly ended the plans of Janusz's cousin Bogusław, who lost his army in the Battle of Prostki and died in exile in Königsberg on 31 December 1669. 

With the passing of both cousins, the Radziwiłł family fortunes waned. Bogusław became commonly known as Gnida ("Louse") by his fellow nobles, and Janusz was called  Zdrajca ("Traitor"). Their treason against the Commonwealth largely overshadowed the deeds of the next generation's numerous other family members, including Michał Kazimierz Radziwiłł (1625–1680), who served faithfully against the Swedes.

Assessment

Although seen as an act of treason by contemporaries, modern views on the Swedish–Lithuanian accord differ. Some argue that the arrangement with the Swedes was made by Janusz Radziwiłł not out of greed and the political ambition, but rather out of Realpolitik. According to another theory, Janusz Radziwiłł was merely attempting to secure a strong ally against Russia. The Grand Duchy of Lithuania lacked the resources to fight a war on two fronts, and the Polish Crown, which now had its own serious problems and could supply only trifling amounts of money and military forces. However, some Lithuanian intellectuals during the National Revival, including Maironis, praised the Lithuanian nobility for trying to secede from Poland and secure the sovereignty of Lithuania.

See also
 Polish–Swedish union

Sources

References

Bibliography

 

Second Northern War
1655 in Lithuania
1655 in the Polish–Lithuanian Commonwealth
1655 treaties
Kedainiai
1655 in Sweden
Lithuania–Sweden relations
Personal unions